
This is a list of players who graduated from the Web.com Tour in 2012. The top 25 players on the Web.com Tour's money list in 2012 earned their PGA Tour card for 2013.

*PGA Tour rookie in 2013
 Retained his PGA Tour card for 2014: won or finished in the top 125 of the money list or FedEx Cup points list.
 Retained PGA Tour conditional status and qualified for the Web.com Tour Finals: finished between 126–150 on FedEx Cup list and qualified for Web.com Tour Finals.
 Failed to retain his PGA Tour card for 2014 but qualified for the Web.com Tour Finals: finished between 150–200 on FedEx Cup list.
 Failed to retain his PGA Tour card for 2014 and to qualify for the Web.com Tour Finals: finished outside the top 200 on FedEx Cup list.

Scott Gardiner, Lee Williams, Brad Fritsch, and Jim Herman regained their cards for 2014 through the Web.com Tour Finals. Andrew Svoboda played a few events on the Web.com Tour in 2013, and a win at the Price Cutter Charity Championship led to him finishing 25th on the regular season money list, giving him a PGA Tour card for 2014.

Winners on the PGA Tour in 2013

Runners-up on the PGA Tour in 2013

See also
2012 PGA Tour Qualifying School graduates

References

External links
Web.com Tour official site

Korn Ferry Tour
PGA Tour
Web.com Tour graduates
Web.com Tour graduates